László Böcskei (born July 11, 1965) is a Romanian cleric, bishop of the Roman Catholic Diocese of Oradea Mare. Born into an ethnic Hungarian family in Gătaia (Gátalja), Timiș County, he studied at the Roman Catholic Theological Institute of Alba Iulia. He was ordained in June 1990 by Bishop Sebastian Kräuter and assigned to the Timișoara Diocese. He served as assistant priest at a Timișoara parish before being assigned to the city's St. George Cathedral. In 2006, having reached the age of 75, József Tempfli announced his intention to retire as Bishop of Oradea Mare, and Pope Benedict XVI chose Böcskei as his successor. He was consecrated bishop in March 2009.

Notes

1965 births
Living people
People from Gătaia
21st-century Roman Catholic bishops in Romania
Romanian religious leaders of Hungarian descent